The Glory Years is a DVD of the rock group Gillan, released in 2008 by Eagle Rock Entertainment. It consists of a live concert recorded at Oxford Polytechnic, England on February 18, 1981 for the BBC series 'Rock Goes to College', and several of the band's guest performances on German TV and BBC's TV chart show Top of the Pops.

Track listing
1. "Unchain Your Brain" (Gillan/McCoy/Torme)
2. "Mr. Universe" (Gillan/Towns)
3. "No Easy Way" (Gillan/McCoy/Torme)
4. "Trouble" (Leiber/Stoller)
5. "Mutually Assured Destruction" (Gillan/McCoy/Torme/Towns/Underwood)
6. "On The Rocks" (Gillan/Towns)
7. "Vengeance" (Gillan/Towns)
8. "New Orleans" (Frank Guida/Joseph Royster)
 Live at Oxford Polytechnic, Feb 18, 1981 (first transmitted on Feb 23, 1981)
9. "Vengeance" (Gillan/Towns)
 German TV
10. "Sleeping On The Job" (Gillan/Towns)
 Promotional video
11. "Trouble" (Leiber/Stoller)
12. "New Orleans" (Guida/Royster)
13. "No Laughing In Heaven" (Gillan/McCoy/Torme/Underwood)
14. "Mutually Assured Destruction" (Gillan/McCoy/Torme/Towns/Underwood)
 Top of the Pops (BBC TV)

Personnel
Ian Gillan - Lead vocals.
Bernie Torme - Guitar.
John McCoy - Bass guitar.
Colin Towns - Keyboards.
Mick Underwood - Drums.

References

2008 films
Gillan (band) albums
2008 video albums
2000s English-language films